Elsalvadoria is a genus of crabs in the family Pseudothelphusidae, containing the following species:
 Elsalvadoria tomhaasi Bott, 1970
 Elsalvadoria zurstrasseni (Bott, 1956)

References

Pseudothelphusidae